The John Varley Reader is a representative collection of 18 of the science fiction short stories by John Varley, first published in paperback in September 2004. It features 5 new stories. Each story is preceded by an autobiographical introduction; until this book Varley had avoided discussing himself, or his works, in print.

Contents
Introduction
"Picnic on Nearside"
"Overdrawn at the Memory Bank"
"In the Hall of the Martian Kings"
"Gotta Sing, Gotta Dance"
"The Barbie Murders"
"The Phantom of Kansas"
"Beatnik Bayou"
"Air Raid"
"The Persistence of Vision"
"Press Enter"
"The Pusher"
"Tango Charlie and Foxtrot Romeo"
"Options"
"Just Another Perfect Day"
"In Fading Suns and Dying Moons"
"The Flying Dutchman"
"Good Intentions"
"The Bellman"

External links
 

2004 short story collections
American short story collections
Science fiction short story collections
Eight Worlds series
Ace Books books